Cevenini is an Italian surname. Notable people with the surname include:

Aldo Cevenini (1889–1973), Italian footballer and manager
Luigi Cevenini (1895–1968), Italian footballer and manager, brother of Aldo

Italian-language surnames